Kobylisy Shooting Range is a former military shooting range located in Kobylisy, a northern suburb of Prague, Czech Republic. 

The shooting range was established in 1889–1891, on a site that was at the time far outside the city, as a training facility for the Austro-Hungarian (and, later, Czechoslovak) army. During the Nazi occupation it was used for mass executions as part of retaliatory measures against the Czech people after the assassination of Reinhard Heydrich in 1942. About 550 Czech patriots of every social rank were killed here, most of them between 30 May and 3 July 1942, when executions took place almost every day. Their bodies were subsequently incinerated in Strašnice Crematorium.      

The site was converted to a memorial after World War II, and its current dimensions date to the 1970s when the large paneláks (Communist-era tower blocks) of a new housing estate encroached upon it. Kobylisy Shooting Range has had the status of national cultural monument since 1978. Today it is freely accessible and is within ten minutes' walk of the Kobylisy or Ládví metro stations.

Notable victims
 Jan Auerhan, director of the State Bureau of Statistics
 Gen. Alois Eliáš, prime minister
 František Erben, Sokol member and gymnast
 Lt. Col. Josef Mašín soldier, member of the Three Kings resistance group
 Matěj Pavlík-Gorazd, bishop of the Czechoslovak Orthodox Church, later canonised as St. Gorazd
 Františka Plamínková, senator, feminist
 Evžen Rošický, journalist, athlete
 Vladislav Vančura, physician, writer and film director 
 26 citizens of Lidice (members of the Horák and Stříbrný families arrested before the extermination of the village, and men who were away at work that night)

External links  

 History of the site, complete lists of the executed, photogallery  
 Description of the site

Buildings and structures in Prague
Execution sites
1942 in Czechoslovakia
History of Prague
National Cultural Monuments of the Czech Republic
Nazi war crimes in Czechoslovakia
World War II sites in the Czech Republic
Shooting ranges in the Czech Republic
Mass murder in 1942